Ciné Polar was a French television channel owned by AB Groupe.

History
The channel was originally only available on AB Sat and as an option on CanalSat, but is now available through a cinema contract with AB, on cable, on ADSL, and on digital television packages.

Change in cinema package :
At its launch in 1996, the cinema package of AB Groupe comprised five channels: Ciné Palace, Rire (comedies), Romance (sentimental films), Polar (crime and suspense films) and Action
Due to the repackaging of the cinema package in September 2002, the cinema package formerly known as CINEBOX now has new channels named Ciné Box, Ciné comic (formerly Rire), Ciné Polar (formerly Polar) and Ciné Fx.
Today, Ciné Fx and Ciné Polar are no longer available.

At it launch time, the group purchased the cinema channel Action in 1996.

At the heart of the programming are the big names in classic films noirs, notably the first works of Alfred Hitchcock.

On 4 December 2012, Ciné Polar became Polar again. On 20 November 2015, the channel was removed from the TV d'Orange offer.

On 6 December 2016, Polar and Ciné FX were replaced by Paramount Channel and Crime District on Bis Télévisions.

Polar and Ciné FX' closure was planned for long-time ago, on 31 December 2015 and later reported to 30 April 2018.

On 31 July 2018, Polar was ultimately closed on Free and was replaced by Crime District.

Managers
 Président  Jean-Michel Fava
 Director of cinema channels  Laurent Zameczkowsk
 Director of programmes  Richard Maroko

References

External links
 

Mediawan Thematics
Television channels and stations established in 1996
Defunct television channels in France
1996 establishments in France
Television stations in France
French-language television stations